Oliver James (born Oliver James Hutson; 1 June 1980) is an English actor, musician, singer, and songwriter.

Acting career

James trained at the Guildford School of Acting and made his acting debut in the made-for-television short film School's Out as Dean. He then appeared in an episode for the BBC television series The Afternoon Play.

In 2002, James was cast as the role of Ian Wallace in the teen romantic comedy What a Girl Wants. The film was directed by Dennie Gordon and co-starred Amanda Bynes. The movie was released in 2003, to mixed critical reception, and a moderate box office with worldwide earnings of $50,732,139.

In 2004, James was cast to portray the role of Jay Corgan in New Line Cinema's musical drama film Raise Your Voice. The film which was directed by Sean McNamara and co-starred Hilary Duff. The film received negative reviews from critics and was a box-office bomb earning worldwide $14,867,514.

In 2006, James signed on for the BBC drama television series The Innocence Project portraying the role of Nick Benitz. The eight-episode first season received negative reviews from critics. Ratings were very poor and the BBC chose to pull the series midway through season one, with the show not being renewed for a second season.

In 2009, James portrayed the role of Ben in Paramount Home Entertainment's Direct-to-DVD sequel Without a Paddle: Nature's Calling. The film received negative reviews.

In 2011, James appeared in a leading role in the TV film Roadkill. In 2012, he appeared in the TV film Black Forest.

Music career
Shortly after appearing in The Afternoon Play, James joined a boy band produced by Simon Fuller. He quit the band as soon as he was cast in What A Girl Wants. For What A Girl Wants, he learned to play the guitar and sang the songs "Long Time Coming" and "Greatest Story Ever Told" which appear on the film's soundtrack. He played the acoustic guitar and sang the last song in Raise Your Voice.

Filmography

References

External links

1980 births
Alumni of the Guildford School of Acting
English male film actors
English male television actors
English male singers
Living people
People from Ottershaw
21st-century English singers
21st-century British male singers
21st-century English male actors